Madunice is a large village and municipality in Slovakia in Trnava region in Hlohovec District.

Etymology
The name comes from the Slovak word medunica: a honey plant, in Western Slovak dialects madunica.

Situation 
Madunice is situated on the right bank of river Váh, approximately one kilometer away from the river. North of Madunice are Drahovce, on east Koplotovce, on south Červeník and Leopoldov and on west Pečeňady.

Transportation 
Road no. 61 leads through Madunice. It is also accessible from highway D1, exit 72 – Červeník. Madunice lie on the 106.6th kilometer of Váh fairway. In the town, there are four bus stops. Buses in directions to Piešťany, Trnava, Hlohovec and Veľké Kostoľany stop here. Certain long-line buses stop here as well.

Close to the town is the main Slovak railway corridor Bratislava – Žilina – Čierna nad Tisou. Kilometer away from the town center there is a former building of a train stop, nowadays an object of the Slovakian railway company. By 2008, the modernization of the corridor should be finished. Within the modernization, the old platforms were demolished and replaced by new, higher, and wheelchair-accessible platforms. The railway crossing was abandoned and an underpass for pedestrians was built. The nearest airport is in Piešťany, 15 kilometers away.

Municipal property 
The town is connected to electrical and gas supply, and has an independent water supply. Sewage is under construction, before that, the waste water was stored in septic tanks. Communal and sorted waste are regularly collected and liquidated. The center of Madunice is the local square. The new House of Culture is situated here, with a town hall, post-office, pharmacy, restaurant and more. A public park is located right next to the square. There are many Services and shops. There is a kindergarten and a school in Madunice. Many cultural events are held at the Amphitheatre. A football stadium is also present. There is a Roman Catholic Church of Birth of Virgin Mary and a cemetery. 
On the Váh Canal is the Madunice power plant. On the town limits the agriculture company has its base. About 750 meters behind the town there is an "industrial estate" with various firms.

Culture

Church of Birth of Virgin Mary 
By the main road near the center is the Roman Catholic Church. It is a single-nave hall with a sacristy on the right side of the church. In the church there is a side altar made from an oak, under which Ján Hollý composed his poems. Next to the church, there was once a cemetery, but it was moved to a new place. In front of the church is a small park with a larger than life-size statue of Hollý. As of 2006 a reconstruction of the church was in progress.

Amphitheatre 
An amphitheatre with a snack bar and a stage is located on the east part of Madunice. Concerts, discos and the Onion festival take place here.

Onion festival 
In August, the Onion festival is held. It takes for three days. Games are played, for example the competition for the longest onion garland. A fair comes to the town and steeplechase is performed. The onion parade goes from the center to the Amphitheatre. Live music is played.

Ján Hollý 
Ján Hollý lived in Madunice from 1814. He worked here as a pastor. He composed his poems in a wood called Mlíč. It used to be on the place of present train stop. Several pieces of furniture were made from an oak under which Ján Hollý used to compose. However, some planks were saved and an altar was crafted from them. In the pastorate, there is Hollý's remembrance room. It is a part of the Slovak national culture heritage. After a large fire of Madunice, Ján Hollý left to Dobrá Voda.

Other 
In 2003 the on the Váh Canal, the World freshwater fishing championship took place. Thanks to flat terrain, recreational cycling can be performed. It is also possible to swim in former sand and gravel pits. In 1993, the book Madunice, 880th anniversary of first literal mention about the town from Karol Kabát was set out.

References

Notes

External links 
 Madunice on Google maps
 A closer look on center; up is the Culture house, down is the church

Villages and municipalities in Hlohovec District